Kubanka is a rural locality (a settlement) and the administrative center of Kubansky Selsoviet, Kalmansky District, Altai Krai, Russia. The population was 474 as of 2013. There are 11 streets.

Geography 
Kubanka is located on the Kalmanka River, 17 km southwest of Kalmanka (the district's administrative centre) by road. Logovskoye is the nearest rural locality.

References 

Rural localities in Kalmansky District